The Mainz Anonymous (or the Narrative of the Old Persecutions) is an account of the First Crusade of 1096 written soon thereafter by an anonymous Jewish author. The work is written in Hebrew. Its author is unknown and it deals primarily with the Crusaders' actions in Mainz; hence the name commonly applied to it. However, it also deals with the ShUM-cities in the Rhineland, specifically Speyer and Worms. It is not entirely accurate: it has a definite Jewish point of view and fictionalizes anecdotes occasionally to make a point. It also includes occasional anguished supplications to God.

References and further reading
Robert Chazan, European Jewry and the First Crusade (California, 1987).
Robert Chazan, In the Year 1096: The First Crusade and the Jews (JPS, 1996).
A. M. Habermann, גזרות אשכנז וצרפת [Massacres of France and Germany, Hebrew] (c. 1945).

External links

 Google Books copy of "The+Narrative+of+the+Old+Persecutions"
 Copy of The Narrative of Old Persecutions at York University

Anonymous works
Crusade chronicles
German chronicles
Jewish medieval literature
Hebrew manuscripts
11th-century history books
Mainz
First Crusade